Juhan is a common Estonian male given name.

Given name
Juhan Aare (born 1948), Estonian journalist and politician
Juhan Aavik (1884–1982), Estonian composer
Juhan Mihkel Ainson (1873–1962), Estonian politician
Juhan af Grann (born 1948 as Heikki Juhani Grann), Finnish film director and producer
Juhan Jaanuson (1894–1967), Estonian statistician and politician
Juhan Jaik (1899–1948), Estonian writer and journalist
Juhan Kalm (1884–1953), Estonian agronomist and politician
Juhan Kikas (1892–1944, also known as Jaan Kikkas), Estonian weightlifter
Juhan Kivirähk (born 1957), Estonian sociologist
Juhan Kreem (born 1971), historian, writer, and archivist
Juhan Kukk (1885–1942), Estonian politician
Juhan Kunder (1852–1888), Estonian writer
Juhan Kurvits (1895–1939), Estonian politician
Juhan Lasn (1861–1930), Estonian politician
Juhan Leeman (1872-19??), Estonian politician and educator
Juhan Leinberg (1812–1885), Estonian religious leader, also known as prophet Maltsvet
Juhan Liiv (1864–1913), Estonian poet
Juhan Luiga (1873–1927), Estonian psychiatrist, author, publicist, and politician
Juhan Albert Luur (1883–1937), Estonian politician
Juhan Maaker (1845–1930), Estonian folk musician
Juhan Maiste (born 1952), Estonian art historian and professor
Juhan Mettis (born 1990), Estonian judoka
Juhan Muks (1899–1983), Estonian artist and painter
Juhan Narma (1888–1942), Estonian politician
Juhan Parts (born 1966), Estonian politician
Juhan Peegel (1919–2007), Estonian journalist, linguist and writer
Juhan Simm (1885–1959), Estonian composer, conductor and choral conductor
Juhan Smuul (1922–1971), Estonian writer, until 1954 he used the given name Johannes Schmuul
Juhan Sütiste (1899–1945), Estonian poet
Juhan Tõrvand (1883–1942), Estonian military Major General 
Juhan Treisalt (1898–1980, better known as Ivan Triesault), Estonian-born American actor
Juhan Ulfsak (born 1973), Estonian actor
Juhan Uuemaa (1903–1942), Estonian politician and lawyer
Juhan Viiding (1948–1995), Estonian poet and actor, also known under the pseudonym of Jüri Üdi

Surname
Alexander Juhan (1765–1845), American violinist, composer and conductor
Frank Juhan, (1887–1967), American football player

References

Estonian masculine given names